Ocko or Očko is a surname. Notable people include:

 Antonín Janda-Očko (1892–1960), Czech footballer
 Jan Očko of Vlašim (died 1380), Czech archbishop
 Peter Ocko, American television producer
 Franc Očko (born 1960), Slovenian judoka

See also
 

Czech-language surnames
Slovene-language surnames